The 1941–42 Western Kentucky State Teachers Hilltoppers men's basketball team represented Western Kentucky State Normal School and Teachers College (now known as Western Kentucky University) during the 1941-42 NCAA basketball season. The team was led by future Naismith Memorial Basketball Hall of Fame coach Edgar Diddle.  The Hilltoppers won the Kentucky Intercollegiate Athletic Conference and Southern Intercollegiate Athletic Association championships, led NCAA in wins, and received an invitation to the 1942 National Invitation Tournament, where they advanced to the championship game.  During this period, the NIT was considered to be the premiere college basketball tournament, with the winner being recognized as the national champion.
This was the first Kentucky team to participate in the NIT.   Oran McKinney, Earl Shelton, and Wallace “Buck” Sydnor were selected to the All-SIAA team, while the All-KIAC Team included Howard “Tip” Downing, Shelton, and Sydnor.

Schedule

|-
!colspan=6| Regular Season

|-

 

|-
!colspan=6| 1942 Kentucky Intercollegiate Athletic Conference Tournament

|-
!colspan=6| 1942 Southern Intercollegiate Athletic Association Tournament

|-
!colspan=6| 1942 National Invitation Tournament

References

Western Kentucky Hilltoppers basketball seasons
Western Kentucky State Teachers
Western Kentucky State Teachers